JCBC may refer to:

 Jatayu Conservation Breeding Centre, Pinjore, Haryana state, India
 Jesus College Boat Club (Cambridge)
 Jesus College Boat Club (Oxford)
 Junior College of Broward County, the original name of Broward College in Fort Lauderdale, Florida
Journal of Computational Biophysics and Chemistry